S&P Global Commodity Insights is a provider of energy and commodities information and a source of benchmark price assessments in the physical commodity markets. The business was started with the foundation in 1909 of the magazine National Petroleum News by Warren C. Platt.

S&P Global Commodity Insights is recognized as one of the most significant price reporting agencies for the oil market.

Overview
From an original focus on the oil industry, S&P Global Platts gradually expanded its purview to include metals, agriculture, shipping, and all energy-related markets – oil, coal, natural gas, electricity, nuclear power, petrochemicals, renewables, and emissions.  S&P Global Platts is a division of S&P Global, Inc.,, a provider of ratings, benchmarks and analytics to the global capital and commodity markets. The firm is a sister to brands such as S&P Global Ratings, S&P Global Market Intelligence and S&P Dow Jones Indices. It had been part of the Commodities & Commercial group of S&P Global, however that group saw all of its assets (besides Platts) slowly sold off. It is now considered a stand-alone division of S&P Global.

History
Warren C. Platt (1883–1963) started the magazine National Petroleum News in Cleveland, Ohio in 1909.  He expanded the business with the publication of the newsletter called Platts Oilgram in 1923, which went on to be recognized as an influential source for petroleum prices.  The companies founded by Platt that published prices and news were acquired in 1953 to become part of what was then known as McGraw-Hill group, which was later to become S&P Global.  The publication activities that started with petroleum later expanded to cover energy and commodities, which were all undertaken by the division that became known as Platts.

In 2000, McGraw-Hill merged Platts with other like assets to turn the company into a provider of energy information.

Beginning in 2010, Platts' parent has made numerous acquisitions to significantly grow the Platts business. The acquired companies were Bentek, Eclipse Energy, Kingsman, Minerals Value Service, RigData  and PIRA. An attempt to acquire OPIS in 2011 failed following market objections and Federal Trade Commission resistance.

Platts' first significant acquisition came in 2001, when it acquired FT Energy. That acquisition gave it the Platts Global Energy Awards, considered one of the industry's biggest awards event, held every December in New York.

Other acquisitions made by S&P Global Platts:

2010: Bentek Energy, a natural gas-focused analytics firm

2016: RigData for an undisclosed amount, Platts' first significant expansion into the upstream sector of the energy industry. (S&P Global Platts sold RigData to Drillinginfo in 2019.)

2016: Commodity Flow for an undisclosed amount.

2022: IHS Energy as part of corporate merger.

See also

 Foster Natural Gas/Oil Report
 Mean of Platts Singapore
 Oil & Gas Journal

References

External links
Official website
Platts podcasts

Petroleum economics
Research and analysis firms of the United Kingdom
Research and analysis firms of the United States
1953 mergers and acquisitions